Erik Sebastian Collberg (born February 23, 1994) is a Swedish professional ice hockey right winger, currently playing for BIK Karlskoga in the HockeyAllsvenskan. He was selected 33rd overall by the Montreal Canadiens in the 2012 NHL Entry Draft.

Playing career
Collberg made his professional debut in the 2010–11 season with Frölunda HC of the then Elitserien (SHL).

On March 5, 2014, the Montreal Canadiens traded Collberg and a conditional 2nd round pick in the 2014 NHL Entry Draft to the New York Islanders in exchange for left winger Thomas Vanek and a conditional 5th round pick in the 2014 NHL Entry Draft.

On May 13, 2016, the New York Islanders placed Collberg on unconditional waivers in order to terminate the final year of his contract. On May 16, 2016, Collberg returned to Sweden in agreeing to a two-year contract with Rögle BK of the SHL.

Collberg moved to Timrå IK for the 2018–19 season where he recorded 7 goals and 11 points in 37 games but was unable to prevent Timrå's relegation.

Collberg left Sweden for Austrian club Graz 99ers of the EBEL, signing a one-year contract as a free agent on April 29, 2019.

Career statistics

Regular season and playoffs

International

References

External links
 

1994 births
Living people
BIK Karlskoga players
Bridgeport Sound Tigers players
Löwen Frankfurt players
Frölunda HC players
Graz 99ers players
Hamilton Bulldogs (AHL) players
Montreal Canadiens draft picks
Örebro HK players
Rögle BK players
Stockton Thunder players
Swedish ice hockey right wingers
Timrå IK players